Li Xiaoran (born 8 May 1976) is a Chinese actress. She graduated from Beijing Dance Academy at the age of 17, and was the only dancer recruited into the Oriental Song and Dance Troupe from Beijing.

Filmography

Television series

Awards and nominations

References

External links

Sina 

Chinese film actresses
Chinese television actresses
Living people
1976 births
Chinese female dancers
Actresses from Beijing
20th-century Chinese actresses
21st-century Chinese actresses
Beijing Dance Academy alumni